The Roslyn Overbridge (also known as Roslyn Bridge or Highgate Bridge) is a landmark in the New Zealand city of Dunedin.

The bridge, constructed in 1954 consists of a single arch, and lies at the heart of one of the city's more complex interchanges. The suburb of Roslyn lies on and around Highgate on either side of the bridge, with its main shopping area being immediately to the south.

The bridge is visible from much of Dunedin. Views across the central city and Otago Harbour to Otago Peninsula can be gained from the bridge.

References

Buildings and structures in Dunedin
Bridges in Otago
Bridges completed in 1954
1950s architecture in New Zealand